Otala lactea, known as the milk snail or Spanish snail, is a large, edible species of air-breathing land snail, a terrestrial pulmonate gastropod mollusk, in the family Helicidae, the typical snails.

Archaeological recovery at the Ancient Roman site of Volubilis, in Morocco, illustrates prehistoric exploitation of O. lactea by humans.

Distribution
This species of snail is native to the western Mediterranean Basin in the southern Iberian Peninsula, Morocco, Algeria, Balearic and Canary Islands, Malta and Corsica. It has been introduced to the Azores, Madeira, United States, including Arizona, California, Florida, and Texas, and to Bermuda, Cuba, and southeastern Australia.

Anatomy

This snail creates and uses love darts as part of its courtship behaviour, prior to mating. The shell of the snail plays an important role on its quality of life. This is because the calcium in the snails shell allows for shell regeneration to take place, if the shell was ever to be broken.

O. lactea has developed the evolutionary adaptation of estivation to help it deal with harsh conditions such as drought or famine. During this time, O. lactea suppresses its metabolism. This effects many of the body functions. On a cellular level, this conversion from normal to estivation is seen impacting the Na+/K+-ATPase function. The Na+/K+-ATPase activity has been shown to be significantly reduced during estivation. As the Na+/K+-ATPase pump uses quite a lot of ATP, the suppression of this pump plays a key role in the conversion to estivation in the O. lactea.

References 

 Rossmässler, E. A. (1854-1858). Iconographie der Land- & Süßwasser-Mollusken Europa's, mit vorzüglicher Berücksichtigung kritischer und noch nicht abgebildeter Arten. (1) 3 (1/2) [13-14]: I-VIII + 1–39. pl. 61-70 [≥ Sept. 1854]; (1) 3 (3/4) [15-16]: I-VIII + 41-77. pl. 71-80 [≥ Aug. 1856]; (1) 3 (5/6) [17-18]: I-VIII + 81-140. pl. 81-90
 Péchaud, J. (1884). Excursions malacologiques dans le nord de l'Afrique de la Calle a Alger, d'Alger a Tanger.
 Pallary, P. (1915). Description de quelques mollusques nouveaux du Grand Atlas. Bulletin du Muséum National d'Histoire Naturelle, Zoologie, 21 (1): 21-28. Paris.
 Pallary, P. (1918). Diagnoses d'une cinquantaine de mollusques terrestres nouveaux du Nord de l'Afrique. Bulletin de la Société d'Histoire Naturelle d'Afrique du Nord, 9 (7): 137-152. Alger
 Pallary, P. (1919). Hélicidées nouvelles du Maroc. 2e Partie. Journal de Conchyliologie, 64 (2) [1918]: 51-69, pl. 2-3. Paris.
 Pallary, P. (1920). Descriptions d'une nouvelle cinquantaine de mollusques terrestres nouveaux du Nord-Ouest de l'Afrique. Bulletin de la Société d'Histoire Naturelle d'Afrique du Nord, 11 (2): 18-34. Alger.
 Pallary, P. (1920). Récoltes malacologiques du capitaine Paul Martel dans la partie septentrionale du Maroc. Journal de Conchyliologie, 65 (1): 1-39, pl. 1-3; 65 (2): 131-160, pl. 4-5. Paris.
 Pallary, P. (1922). Faune malacologique du Grand Atlas. Journal de Conchyliologie, 66 (2) [1921]: 89-154, pl. 3-5; 66 (3) [1921]: 185-217. Paris. 
 Pallary, P. (1923). Vingt mollusques terrestres nouveaux du Maroc. Bulletin de la Société d'Histoire Naturelle d'Afrique du Nord, 14 (3): 112-118. Alger.
 Pallary, P. (1924). Note sur quelques mollusques d'un dépôt pléistocène de Colomb-Béchar. Bulletin de la Société d'Histoire naturelle de l'Afrique du Nord. 15 (3): 111-113. Alger
 Pallary, P. (1926). Compléments à la faune malacologique de la Berbérie. Journal de Conchyliologie, 70 (1): 1-50, pl. 1-8. Paris
 Pallary, P. (1928). Notice sur seize mollusques nouveaux du Maroc découverts en 1926-1927. Journal de Conchyliologie, 72 (1): 1-24, pl. 1-4. Paris.
 Bank, R. A.; Neubert, E. (2017). Checklist of the land and freshwater Gastropoda of Europe. Last update: July 16th, 2017
 Holyoak, D.T. & Holyoak, G.A. (2017). A revision of the land-snail genera Otala and Eobania (Gastropoda, helicidae) in Morocco and Algeria. Journal of Conchology, 40 (6): 419-490. Londo

External links
 Müller, O. F. (1774). Vermium terrestrium et fluviatilium, seu animalium infusorium, Helminthicorum, et testaceorum, non marinorum, succincta historia. vol 2: I-XXXVI, 1-214, 10 unnumbered pages. Havniae et Lipsiae, apud Heineck et Faber, ex officina Molleriana
 More images: 
Otala lactea   on the UF / IFAS Featured Creatures Web site
 Images: 

Helicidae
Gastropods described in 1774
Taxa named by Otto Friedrich Müller
Taxobox binomials not recognized by IUCN